Arras is the capital of the Pas-de-Calais department in northern France.

Arras may also refer to:

People and places
 August Arras (1881–1968), Estonian politician
 Konrad Arras (1876–1930), Estonian politician
 Wim Arras (born 1964), Belgian cyclist
 Arras, Albania, a village in eastern Albania

Other
 Battle of Arras (disambiguation), several battles of that name 
Arras culture, an archaeological culture of the British Iron Age
 Arras-class aviso, a class of thirty French avisos
 Arras Mountain, a summit in British Columbia, Canada
 HMCS Arras, a Battle class trawler
 A hanging tapestry, known chiefly for the one behind which Polonius hides in Gertrude's closet scene, in Shakespeare's Hamlet (Act III, Scene iv)
 Las arras, in Hispanic weddings, the thirteen coins presented to the bride by the groom, to symbolize the groom's commitment to 'provide' for his bride and make his wealth hers
 The Arras, the tallest building in Asheville, North Carolina, United States

See also 
 d'Arras, a French surname
 Ar Rass (disambiguation)